Charlene Rajendran (born 1964 in Malacca) is a Malaysian writer based in Singapore. She currently teaches theatre at the Nanyang Technological University.

Published works
Rajendran's first book was a collection of poetry called Mangosteen Crumble (Team East, 1999). It explored issues of identity and difference, often by using Malaysian English syntax. It is now out of print, and the entire contents have been placed online.

Her second book was Taxi Tales on a Crooked Bridge (Matahari Books, 2009), a non-fiction book based on her conversations with the taxi-drivers of Singapore, where she now lives. This quirky book also includes some poetry and photography. It debuted at No. 2 on the MPH Local Non-Fiction best-seller list for the week ending 17 May 2009.

External links
 Interview with Charlene Rajendran in The Sun. 20 May 2009.
 Interview in The Star 21 June 2009
 Taxi Tales on a Crooked Bridge on Amazon.com
 Mangosteen Crumble on Amazon.com

References

Malaysian writers
1964 births
Living people
Malaysian people of Indian descent